An ant colony is a population of a single ant species capable to maintain its complete lifecycle. Ant colonies are eusocial, communal, and efficiently organized and are very much like those found in other social Hymenoptera, though the various groups of these developed sociality independently through convergent evolution. The typical colony consists of one or more egg-laying queens, numerous sterile females (workers, soldiers) and, seasonally, many winged sexual males and females.  In order to establish new colonies, ants undertake flights that occur at species-characteristic times of the day. Swarms of the winged sexuals (known as alates) depart the nest in search of other nests. The males die shortly thereafter, along with most of the females. A small percentage of the females survive to initiate new nests.

Names
The term "ant colony" refers to a population of workers, reproductive individuals, and brood that live together, cooperate, and treat one another non-aggressively. Often this comprises the genetically related progeny from a single queen, although this is not universal across ants. The name "ant farm" is commonly given to ant nests that are kept in formicaria, isolated from their natural habitat. These formicaria are formed so scientists can study by rearing or temporarily maintaining them. Another name is "formicary", which derives from the Medieval Latin word formīcārium. The word also derives from formica. "Ant nests" are the physical spaces in which the ants live. These can be underground, in trees, under rocks, or even inside a single acorn. The name "anthill" applies to aboveground nests where the workers pile sand or soil outside the entrance, forming a large mound.

Colony size 
Colony size (the number of individuals that make up the colony) is very important to ants: it can affect how they forage, how they defend their nests, how they mate, and even their physical appearances. Body size is often seen as the most important factor in shaping the natural history of non-colonial organisms; similarly, colony size is key in influencing how colonial organisms are collectively organized. However, colony sizes are very different in different ant species: some are just several ants living in a twig, while others are super colonies with many millions of workers. Even looking at a single ant colony, seasonal variation can be huge. For example, in the ant Dolichoderus mariae,  one colony can shift from around 300 workers in the summer to over 2,000 workers per queen in the winter. Genetics and environmental factors can cause the variation among colonies of a particular species to be even bigger. Zooming out further, within a related group of different ant species, the differences can be enormous: Formica yessensis has colony sizes that are reported to be 306 million workers while Formica fusca colonies sometimes comprise only 500 workers.

Supercolonies 

A supercolony occurs when many ant colonies over a large area unite. They still continue to recognize genetic differences in order to mate, but the different colonies within the super colony avoid aggression. Until 2000, the largest known ant supercolony was on the Ishikari coast of Hokkaidō, Japan. In 2000, an enormous supercolony of Argentine ants was found in Southern Europe (report published in 2002). Of 33 ant populations tested along the  stretch along the Mediterranean and Atlantic coasts in Southern Europe, 30 belonged to one supercolony with estimated millions of nests and billions of workers, interspersed with three populations of another supercolony. The researchers claim that this case of unicoloniality cannot be explained by loss of their genetic diversity due to the genetic bottleneck of the imported ants. In 2009, it was demonstrated that the largest Japanese, Californian and European Argentine ant supercolonies were in fact part of a single global "megacolony". This intercontinental megacolony represents the most populous recorded animal society on earth, other than humans.

Organizational terminology 
The following terminology is commonly used among myrmecologists to describe the behaviors demonstrated by ants when founding and organizing colonies:

Monogyny Establishment of an ant colony under a single egg-laying queen.
Polygyny Establishment of an ant colony under multiple egg-laying queens.
Oligogyny Establishment of a polygynous colony where the multiple egg-laying queens remain far apart from one another in the nest.
Haplometrosis Establishment of a colony by a single queen.
Pleometrosis Establishment of a colony by multiple queens.
Monodomy Establishment of a colony at a single nest site.
Polydomy Establishment of a colony across multiple nest sites.

Colony structure
Ant colonies have a complex social structure. Ants’ jobs are determined and can be changed by age. As ants grow older their jobs move them farther from the queen, or center of the colony. Younger ants work within the nest protecting the queen and young. Sometimes, a queen is not present and is replaced by egg-laying workers. These worker ants can only lay haploid eggs producing sterile offspring.  Despite the title of queen, she doesn't delegate the tasks to the worker ants; however, the ants choose their tasks based on personal preference.
Ants as a colony also work as a collective "super mind". Ants can compare areas and solve complex problems by using information gained by each member of the colony to find the best nesting site or to find food. Some social-parasitic species of ants, known as the slave-making ant, raid and steal larvae from neighboring colonies.

Excavation 
Ant hill art is a growing collecting hobby. It involves pouring molten metal (typically non-toxic zinc or aluminum), plaster or cement down an ant colony mound acting as a mold and upon hardening, one excavates the resulting structure. In some cases, this involves a great deal of digging. The casts are often used for research and education purposes but many are simply given or sold to natural history museums or sold as folk art or as souvenirs. Usually, the hills are chosen after the ants have abandoned so as to not kill any ants; however in the Southeast United States, pouring into an active colony of invasive fire ants is a novel way to eliminate them.

Ant-beds 

An ant-bed, in its simplest form, is a pile of soil, sand, pine needles, manure, urine, or clay or a composite of these and other materials that build up at the entrances of the subterranean dwellings of ant colonies as they are excavated. A colony is built and maintained by legions of worker ants, who carry tiny bits of dirt and pebbles in their mandibles and deposit them near the exit of the colony. They normally deposit the dirt or vegetation at the top of the hill to prevent it from sliding back into the colony, but in some species, they actively sculpt the materials into specific shapes and may create nest chambers within the mound.

See also 
 Ant colony optimization, a technique in computer science inspired by ant colonies
 Nuno sa punso, a Filipino belief about ant hills

References

External links 

 Journal of Insect Science: The nest architecture of the Florida harvester ant
 Myrmedrome, a realistic ant colony simulator
 Winged Ants, The Male, Dichotomous key to genera of winged male ants in the World, Behavioral ecology of mating flight

Myrmecology
Superorganisms
Insect ecology
Ants
Shelters built or used by animals

de:Ameisen#Nestarten